The Regional Government of Veneto (Giunta Regionale del Veneto) is the executive of Veneto, one of the twenty regions of Italy. The Regional Government, which has its seat at Palazzo Balbi on the Grand Canal, is led by the President of Veneto, who is elected for a five-year term, and composed of the President and ten Ministers (Assessori), including a Vice President.

Current composition

The current regional government has been in office since 16 October 2020, under the leadership of President Luca Zaia of Liga Veneta–Lega, after his re-election in the 2020 Venetian regional election.

List of previous governments

Luca Zaia is the ninth President of Veneto. His predecessor Giancarlo Galan (1995–2010) has been the longest-serving President so far. Since direct election of the President was introduced in 1995-2000, Venetian politics has become far more stable and governments generally last for a full term of five years.

References

 
Politics of Veneto